Pan Jixun (1521–1595), courtesy name Shiliang and pseudonym Yinchuan, was a Chinese scholar-bureaucrat and hydrologist of the Ming dynasty. He was noted for his monograph Overview of River Management (Héfáng Yīlǎn).

Biography
Pan was a native of Wucheng County (modern Huzhou) in Zhejiang. He passed the provincial examination of 1550. He was made a judge in Jiujiang afterwards and became the inspecting censor of Guangdong, director of education for Beizhili, and undersecretary in the Grand Court of Judicial Review. Before leaving Guangdong, he implemented the "fair tax arrangement for the hundred-and-tithing system" (junping lijia fa). Later, he was appointed Right Assistant Censor-in-Chief and then Director-General of the Grand Canal (zongli hedao), but he was soon obliged to resign to mourn his mother's passing. He returned to the position in 1570 and built a low dyke (lüdi) from Xuzhou to Pizhou that incurred criticism for hindering the traffic in tribute grain. He was demoted in the next year. Zhang Juzheng reinstated Pan in 1578, the positions of Director-General of the Grand Canal and Director-General of the Grain Tribute having been combined into a single position known as the zongli hecao tidu junwu. Before this was undone in 1588, he expanded the Han-era Gaojia Weir (Gaojiayan) first constructed by Chen Deng, attempting to use the Huai to clear the silt of the Yellow River which then flowed south into Hongze Lake. He was rewarded with the title of Grand Guardian of the Heir Apparent and promoted first to Minister of Works and then to Right Censor-in-Chief and Director of the Grand Canal (zongdu hedao).

As Director-General of the Grand Canal in 15721574, Wan Gong's solution for the Grand Canal and the Yellow River was building dyke to confine and narrow a section of the watercourse, increasing the velocity of the current ensued and causing the current with higher velocity to carry more silt so that the watercourse would discharge silt into the sea. Pan endorsed and generalized that, summarizing in eight characters: "Clearing silt with current confined by building dykes".

Pan proposed several suggestions towards the Wanli Emperor:

 Fill breaches to keep the Yellow River on its course
 Build dykes to contain future flooding
 Repair sluices and dams to protect the Grand Canal
 Consolidate weirs and embankments
 Suspend dredging of estuaries to reduce expenses
 Suspend any plans to return the Yellow River to its former northern course

During early 1580, Pan became the Minister of War in Nanjing and then the Minister of Justice. He requested that the emperor forgive Zhang Juzheng's bereaved family, which caused him to be demoted to common status in 1584. Four years later, the emperor permitted Grand Secretary Shen Shixing to recall Pan.

Pan used liukun to plug gaps. These were bundles of rods forming a ring around a central trunk, usually more than 20 feet in diameter and 150 feet long. He argued that levees should never be built as extremely long and continuous embankments. There were constituent embankments of the system. Those along a river (lüdi) concentrated the water, those parallel to these (yaodi) were necessary in case the inner dams broke, and transverse dams (gedi) forced silt into controlled deposits. Later, he put forward the idea of reinforcing the embankments with silt gathered in depressions by diverting floods and using silt levees to replace lower lüdi. These practices impeded the drainage of the Huai and Yellow Rivers and expanded Hongze Lake. The prefectural seat of Sizhou was flooded and Ming Zuling tomb was threatened. This led to further censure and forced his resignation soon after Shen's removal. Under the Qing, the situation he left around Hongze Lake led to Sizhou and the Ming Zuling's entire submersion beneath the lake. Even after the Yellow River returned to its northern course in the mid-19th century, it wasn't until the 1960s that the water receded enough to once again reveal the tombs.

Monuments
There is a bridge in Longquan Subdistrict, Wuxing District of Huzhou, Zhejiang named "Pangong Bridge" after Pan Jixun.

References 

1521 births
1595 deaths
Chinese canal engineers
Hydraulic engineers
Chinese hydrologists
Ming dynasty politicians
Ming dynasty essayists
Politicians from Huzhou
Engineers from Zhejiang